is a railway station in Naniwa-ku, Osaka, Osaka Prefecture, Japan, operated by the private railway operator Nankai Electric Railway.

Lines
Ashiharachō Station is served by the Koya Line (Shiomibashi Branch), and has the station number "NK06-4".

Layout
The station has two side platforms serving one track each.

Adjacent stations

Surrounding area
Ashiharabashi Station on the Osaka Loop Line is approximately 200m away.

See also
 List of railway stations in Japan

References

External links

  

Railway stations in Osaka Prefecture
Railway stations in Japan opened in 1912